Hymenoptychis sordida, the pneumatophore moth, is a moth of the family Crambidae. The species was first described by Philipp Christoph Zeller in 1852. It is known from Australia, southern and South-East Asia, several Pacific islands, Seychelles, South Africa, Madagascar and the United Arab Emirates.

The larvae of this species are brown and live in mangroves where they feed on vegetarian detritus. The wingspan is about 25 mm.

Known food plants are Acanthaceae (Avicennia marina and Avicennia sp.).

References

External links
 Swedish Museum of Natural History - picture of type

Spilomelinae
Moths described in 1852
Moths of Madagascar
Moths of Japan
Fauna of Seychelles
Moths of Africa